Qaravaghli Ayibi (also Romanized as Qarāvaghlī Āyībī) is a village in Qeshlaq-e Shomali Rural District, in the Central District of Parsabad County, Ardabil Province, Iran. At the 2006 census, its population was 116, in 23 families.

References 

Towns and villages in Parsabad County